Humeocline is a genus of plants in the family Asteraceae, endemic to Madagascar.

Species
There is only one known species, Humeocline madagascariensis.

References

External links
Madagascar Catalogue,  Humeocline

Monotypic Asteraceae genera
Endemic flora of Madagascar
Gnaphalieae